An undulipodium or undulopodium (a Greek word meaning "swinging foot"), or a 9+2 organelle is a motile filamentous extracellular projection of eukaryotic cells. It is basically synonymous to flagella and cilia which are differing terms for similar molecular structures used on different types of cells, and usually correspond to different waveforms.

The name was coined to differentiate from the analogous structures present in prokaryotic cells. It is structurally a complex of microtubules along with motor proteins. 

The usage of the term was early supported by Lynn Margulis, especially in support of endosymbiotic theory. The eukaryotic cilia are structurally identical to eukaryotic flagella, although distinctions are sometimes made according to function and/or length. The Gene Ontology database does not make a distinction between the two, referring to most undulipodium as "motile cilium", and to that in the sperm as sperm flagellum.

Structure

Undulipodia use a whip-like action to create movement of the whole cell, such as the movement of sperm in the reproductive tract, and also create water movement as in the choanocytes of sponges.

Motile (or secondary) cilia are more numerous, with multiple cilia per cell, move in a wave-like action, and are responsible for movement in organisms such as ciliates and platyhelminthes, but also move extracellular substances in animals, such as the ciliary escalator found in the respiratory tract of mammals and the corona of rotifers.

Primary cilia function as sensory antennae, but are not undulipodia as primary cilia do not have the rotary movement mechanism found in motile cilia.

Undulipodia are an extension of the cell membrane containing both cytoplasm and a regular arrangement of microtubules known as an axoneme. At the base of the extension lies a structure called the kinetosome or basal body which is attached via motor proteins to the microtubules. The kinetosome mediates movement through a chemical reaction, causing the microtubules to slide against one another and the whole structure to bend.

Usage

Biologists such as Margulis strongly advocate the use of the name, because of the apparent structural and functional differences between the cilia and flagella of prokaryotic and eukaryotic cells. They argue that the name flagella should be restricted only to prokaryotic organelles, such as bacterial flagella and spirochaete axial filaments. However, the term is not generally endorsed by most biologists because it is argued that the original purpose of the name does not sufficiently differentiate the cilia and flagella of eukaryotic from those of prokaryotic cells. For example, the early concept was the trivial homology of flagella of flagellates and pseudopodia of rhizopods. The consensus terminology is the use of cilium and flagellum for all purposes.

References

Cell anatomy
Cell movement